Sun Valley High School is a public high school in Aston, Pennsylvania, a part of Delaware County in the Philadelphia suburbs. It is the only high school in the Penn-Delco School District.

The school's mascot is the Vanguard, though its logos, statue, and costume all depict a griffin, a mythical creature. The official school colors are navy blue and vegas gold.

Academics

Curriculum

Core classes-Math, English, Social Studies, and Science-are based on a three-tier system based on student ability, from academic classes to honors level to Advanced Placement. Sun Valley uses a weighted GPA to reflect the change in difficulty between tiers. In order to graduate, students are required to take four years of math and English, three years of social studies and science, and a total of nine elective credits (which can be divided over the four years).

Standardized Testing

Students in the state of Pennsylvania are required to take the Keystone Exams in order to complete select courses and to graduate. Keystone Exams are required for Algebra I, Biology, and Literature. Sun Valley has a 23.7 percentile score on overall Keystone Exams. In mathematics, Sun Valley had a 61% proficiency rate, a percent above the state average. In reading, Sun Valley has a 46% proficiency rate, which is 24% lower than the state average.

Sun Valley offers various Advanced Placement classes. The school has a 58% passing rate, putting it in the 75th percentile. Sun Valley does not offer IB exams.

Arts

There are four band ensembles at Sun Valley (Concert Band, Marching Band, Jazz Band, and Freshmen Percussion), as well as two choir ensembles (Concert Choir and Chamber Choir). The concert ensembles perform two concerts every year, one in the winter and one in the spring. In the spring the two concerts are held separately, while the winter is combined. The later also features the Freshmen Percussion ensemble, featuring developing percussionists. In the winter, the choir holds a fundraising performance entitled Decades, in which students perform pieces from the 1960s to today. The audition-only Chamber Choir performs at choir concerts and at various other local events.

The Sun Valley Marching Vanguards have had unprecedented success for the school at regional competitions, winning six total championships. They won the TOB Atlantic Coast Championship four times: 1977 (tie), 1979, 1980, and 1981. The band now competes in Cavalcade of Bands' American division. In the Cavalcade they Will Have  two Open Class championships (2021 and 2022).

The Sun Valley theater department performs a musical every spring. Recent productions include How The Grinch Stole Christmas, A Christmas Carol, The Wizard of Oz, and The Lion King. The department has been recognized several times by the Greater Philadelphia Cappies, a regional award ceremony for high school theater. The school's 2021 production of A Christmas Carol  set the school record for most Cappie wins, earning two Cappies off of four nominations. Sydney Lamoureux won the Cappie for Best Comedic Actress in a Musical, and Gianni Palmarini won the Cappie for Best Male Vocalist in a Musical. These are two of the most competitive categories in the Cappies competition. The 2022 production of How The Grinch Stole Christmas set the school record for most nominations (5), along with one win.

The art program at Sun Valley often features student artwork throughout the region, displaying them in local establishments and the district's annual calendar. The school holds an annual art show called Arts Alive!, which features art from all students enrolled in Sun Valley's various art classes that year.

Athletics

Sun Valley competes in the PIAA's Ches-Mont League, along with 13 schools from Chester County. Prior to 2007, Sun Valley competed in the Del-Val league, along with other nearby schools.
Sun Valley fields varsity teams in 15 PIAA-sanctioned sports:

The Sun Valley cheer team competes at various competitions throughout the winter. In 2019 and 2020, they were selected to attend the UCA National Cheer Championships in Walt Disney World.

Though not officially a school sponsored sport, Sun Valley fields a boys' ice hockey team that competes in the Inter-County Scholastic Hockey League (ICSHL). Four times (2008, 2014, 2019, and 2020) the team earned a spot in the Flyers Cup tournament, which serves as the championship for high school ice hockey in the eastern half of Pennsylvania.

The school sponsors a unified bocce team that competes against other schools as part of the Pennsylvania Special Olympics. The team has made three trips to the state tournament in Hershey, Pennsylvania, earning silver medals in 2018 and 2019.

Sun Valley also operates a rec league style ultimate Frisbee tournament. Students are drafted onto teams ran by various teachers. The teams then compete in a season that runs from late-November into February.

The most successful of all sun valley sports is wrestling with a student even holding a 87-14 record

Thanksgiving

The Sun Valley varsity football team faces off against rival Chichester on Thanksgiving Day each year. The two teams alternate hosting duties, with Sun Valley hosting the 2021 edition, in which Chichester wins  20-13. Sun Valley currently leads the series 22-13.

Demographics

Race

As of 2016-17:

Gender

As of 2016-17:

Economic

According to the NCES, 226 students (approximately 21% of the student body) are eligible for free lunches, with another 32 (approximately 3%) eligible for reduced lunches.

See also
 Penn-Delco School District

References

High schools in Pennsylvania